Sidney Kargbo (born 1 July 1986 in Freetown) is a Sierra Leonean international footballer who last played for Azerbaijani side Kapaz PFC. He is the younger brother of the Sierra Leone national football team captain Ibrahim Kargbo.

Early life 
Kargbo was born and raised in the east end of Freetown, Sierra Leone to Temne parents.

Career
He began his football career with East End Lions in the Sierra Leone National Premier League. Kargbo is commonly known in Sierra Leone by his nickname Pablo Cham, his former teams are Sierra Rangers, Sporting Charleroi in 2003-2004 sydney was voted best youth player by the sporting charleroi fans and joined 2005 to FC Brussels after 42 games in two year was released from FC Brussels. In November 2008 signed for FC Inter Turku played only one Liigacup match and joined than two months later to K.V. Red Star Waasland.

Position
He is a central defender/defensive midfielder.

International career 
Kargbo plays for the Leone's Star, Sierra Leone senior soccer team. Kargbo made his international debut for Sierra Leone against Mali on September 5, 2006, in Freetown. Since his debut he has been a regular in the Sierra Leone national team.

Personal life 
His older brother is Sierra Leonean international defender Ibrahim Kargbo who currently plays for Willem II in the Dutch Eredivisie. Sidney along with his brother Ibrahim Kargbo are the first brothers to play for the Leone Stars (Sierra Leone national team) since the three Kallon brothers (Mohamed Kallon, Kemokai Kallon, Musa Kallon and Kevin Kargbo.

References

External links

Living people
1986 births
Sierra Leonean footballers
Expatriate footballers in Belgium
R.W.D.M. Brussels F.C. players
Expatriate footballers in Finland
R. Charleroi S.C. players
Sportspeople from Freetown
Temne people
FC Inter Turku players
Expatriate footballers in Azerbaijan
Sierra Leonean expatriate footballers
Association football central defenders
Sierra Leone international footballers